Hisham Matar (born 1970) is an American born British-Libyan writer. His memoir of the search for his father, The Return, won the 2017 Pulitzer Prize for Biography or Autobiography and the 2017 PEN America Jean Stein Book Award. His debut novel In the Country of Men was shortlisted for the 2006 Man Booker Prize. Matar's essays have appeared in the Asharq al-Awsat, The Independent, The Guardian, The Times and The New York Times. His second novel, Anatomy of a Disappearance, was published to wide acclaim on 3 March 2011. He lives and writes in London.

He is a Fellow of the Royal Society of Literature, and Associate Professor of Professional Practice in Comparative Literature, Asia & Middle East Cultures, and English at Barnard College, Columbia University.

Early life
Hisham Matar was born in New York City, in 1970, the second of two sons. His father, Jaballa Matar, who was considered a political dissident for his opinions on Colonel Muammar Qaddafi's coup in 1969, had to move the family away from Tripoli and was working for the Libyan delegation to the United Nations, in New York, at the time of Matar's birth.

The family moved back to Tripoli, Libya, in 1973, but fled the country again in 1979. Matar was nine when they moved to Cairo, where the family lived in exile, and where Matar's father became more vocal against the Gaddafi regime. Matar continued his schooling at Cairo's American school.

In 1982, Matar's brother Ziad left for boarding school in the Swiss Alps. Though Matar desperately wanted to join his brother, he had to wait four more years until he too was sixteen. Because of the continued threats by the Libyan dictatorship against their father (as well as a threat to Ziad's safety while he was studying in Switzerland), however, he could not follow his brother to Switzerland. Both boys had to attend the schools under a false identity. Matar chose a school in England and enrolled in 1986. "I was to pretend that my mother was Egyptian and my father American. It was thought that this would explain, to any Arabs in the school, why my Arabic was Egyptian and why my English was American. My first name was Bob. Ziad chose it because both he and I were fans of Bob Marley and Bob Dylan. I was to pretend I was Christian, though not religious. I was to try to forget my name. If someone called Hisham, I was not to turn." — Hisham Matar, 2011. By the time Matar finished his studies, Ziad was a university student in London. Matar decided to pursue his studies in architecture, and later received an MA in Design Futures at Goldsmiths, University of London.

In 1990, while he was still studying in London, his father Jaballa Matar, was abducted in Cairo. He has been reported missing ever since. In 1996, the family received two letters in his father's handwriting stating that he had been kidnapped by the Egyptian secret police, handed over to the Libyan regime, and imprisoned in the notorious Abu Salim prison in the heart of Tripoli. The letters were the last sign and only thing they had heard from him or about his whereabouts. In 2009, Matar reported that he had received news that his father had been seen alive in 2002, indicating that Jaballa had survived a 1996 massacre of 1200 political prisoners by the Libyan authorities.

"In March 1990, Egyptian secret service agents abducted my father from his home in Cairo. For the first two years they led us to believe that he was being held in Egypt, and told us to keep quiet or else they could not guarantee his safety. In 1992 my father managed to smuggle out a letter. A few months later my mother held it in her hand. His careful handwriting curled tightly on to itself to fit as many words as possible on the single A4 sheet of paper. Words with hardly a space between, above or beneath them. No margins, they run to the brink." —Hisham Matar, 2010.

Works 
Hisham Matar has written two novels, two memoirs, and a children's book published in Italian, Il Libro di Dot. He has also written several articles, essays and short stories that have been published on various websites.

Books

In the Country of Men

Matar began writing his first novel, In the Country of Men, in early 2000. In the autumn of 2005, the publishers Penguin International signed him to a two-book deal. In the Country of Men was published in July 2006 and has been translated into 30 languages.

Anatomy of a Disappearance

Matar's second novel, Anatomy of a Disappearance, contains a character whose father is taken away by the authorities; while Matar acknowledges the relation to his own father's disappearance, he has stated that the novel is not autobiographical.

The Return

In 2016, Matar published his memoir The Return. The memoir centers on Matar's return to his native Libya in 2012 to search for the truth behind the 1990 disappearance of his father, a prominent political dissident of the Gaddafi regime.

Il Libro di Dot 
Il Libro di Dot is a children's book released by Matar in 2017. It is his first children's book and was illustrated by Gianluca Buttolo.

A Month in Siena

On October 17, 2019, Matar published A Month in Siena. The short book is an affectionate and reflective record of his most recent stay in Siena, Italy and his encounters there with Sienese School artworks.

Essays 

"The Light," The New Yorker, September 12, 2011.
"Naima," The New Yorker, January 24, 2011.
"The Return: A Father's Disappearance, A Journey Home," The New Yorker, April 8, 2013.
"The Unsaid: The Silence of Virginia Woolf," The New Yorker, November 10, 2014.
"The Book," The New Yorker, November 10, 2014.
"'I don't remember a time when words were not dangerous,'" The Guardian, June 25, 2016.
"What Your Eyes See," The Financial Times Magazine, October 21, 2016.
"Orphaned Solemnity," The Times Literary Supplement, September 28, 2016.
"Diary," London Review of Books, 18 May 2017.
"A Journalist Abroad Grapples With American Power," The New York Times Book Review, August 28, 2017.

Style 
Matar has explored themes of loss and exile in his first two novels, as well as in his memoir, The Return: Fathers, Sons and the Land in Between. Matar's writing often borrows from and refers to painting, architecture, and music. Though he has said he cannot remember a time when he wasn't writing, Matar first turned to his interests in music—"And because I had no talent in music," he's said, "I became an architect, and I continued writing. Writing seemed like just the thing you keep doing—like breathing, or walking, or eating."

Hisham Matar on his writing process:

Awards and honours 
 2017: Pulitzer Prize for Biography or Autobiography for The Return
 2017: PEN/Jean Stein Book Award for The Return
 2017: Rathbones Folio Prize for The Return
 2017: National Book Critics Circle Award for Autobiography, Finalist for The Return
 2017: Premio Libro Del Año, Gremio de Libreros de Madrid for The Return
 2017: Geschwister-Scholl-Preis for The Return
 2017: Prix du livre étranger (France) for The Return
 2016: The Baillie Gifford Prize, shortlist for The Return
 2016: Costa Biography Award, shortlist for The Return
 2016: The Slightly Foxed Best First Biography Prize for The Return 
 2016: Los Angeles Times – Christopher Isherwood Prize for Autobiographical Prose, finalist for The Return
 2016: The Return cited as one of The New York Times’ “Top 10 Books of 2016” 
 2013: International Dublin Literary Award longlist for Anatomy of a Disappearance
 2012: Arab American Book Award shortlist for Anatomy of a Disappearance
 2012: "Naima", included in The PEN/O. Henry Prize Stories collection of short stories
 2011: RSL Encore Award Shortlist for Anatomy of a Disappearance
 2011: Anatomy of a Disappearance named one of the best books of the year by The Chicago Tribune, The Daily Beast, The Independent, The Guardian, The Telegraph, The Toronto Sun, Irish Times 
 2008: Mary Amelia Cummins Harvey Visiting Fellow Commoner at Girton College, University of Cambridge.
 2008: National Book Critics Circle Awards Nominee for In the Country of Men
 2007: Royal Society of Literature Ondaatje Prize for In the Country of Men 
 2007: Commonwealth Writers' Prize of Europe and South Asia for In the Country of Men
 2007: Library Journal Best Books of the Year for In the Country of Men
 2007: Arab American Book Award for In the Country of Men
 2007: In the Country of Men named one of The New York Times "100 Notable Books of the Year" 
 2007: Premio Gregor von Rezzori for foreign fiction translated into Italian for In the Country of Men 
 2007: Premio Internazionale Flaiano (Sezione Letteratura) for In the Country of Men 
 2006: Man Booker Prize, shortlist for In the Country of Men
 2006: Guardian First Book Award for In the Country of Men

References

External links
 Official Website
 
 Independent Autobiography
 "Libya's Reluctant Spokesman: Hari Kunzru interviews Hisham Matar" - Guernica: A Magazine of Art and Politics
 African Writers' Evening
 Imtidad Blog on Hisham Matar
 "Analysis on Libya after Gaddafi", Charlie Rose panel with Lisa Anderson, American University in Cairo, Matar and David Ignatius, Washington Post; PBS, Oct 20, 2011 (15 m.).
 Hisham Matar Interview on The Lit Show
 "Return to Tripoli" (interview), CBC Ideas, August 1, 2013

1970 births
Living people
21st-century American novelists
Alumni of Goldsmiths, University of London
American male novelists
American people of Libyan descent
Fellows of the Royal Society of Literature
Fellows of Girton College, Cambridge
American male essayists
Writers from New York City
The New Yorker people
21st-century American essayists
21st-century American male writers
Novelists from New York (state)
Libyan novelists
21st-century Libyan writers
Pulitzer Prize for Biography or Autobiography winners
American male biographers